Solrød Strand station is a station on the Køge radial of the S-train network in Copenhagen, Denmark. It serves Solrød Strand, in the northeastern part of the municipality of Solrød, and serves as the extended terminus of service A, with every second train terminating here on weekdays during daytime.

See also
 List of railway stations in Denmark

References

S-train (Copenhagen) stations
Railway stations opened in 1979
Railway stations in Denmark opened in the 20th century